Thomas Willis (1621–1675) was an English physician and anatomist.

Thomas Willis may also refer to:

Thomas Willis (Clerk of the Crown in Chancery) (1576–1656), high-ranking official during the English Civil War
Thomas H. Willis (1850–1925), American painter
Tom Willis (soccer) (born 1983), Australian goalkeeper
Tom Willis (rugby union, born 1979), New Zealand rugby union player
Tom Willis (rugby union, born 1999), England rugby union player
Thomas Willis (sailor) (1756–1797), sailor with the second voyage of James Cook
Tom Willis (The Jeffersons), character in the American sitcom The Jeffersons

See also
Thomas Willys, MP
Thomas Wills (disambiguation)